North American Farms Airport  is a private airport, located 5.6 miles east of Malone, Florida.

Overview
Opened in March 1992, the airport is used for crop dusting operations and the owner's private use.

History 
Originally constructed by the United States Army Air Forces in 1943 as one of four auxiliary airfields for the pilot training school at Marianna Army Airfield.  Its original designation was Bascom  Auxiliary Army Airfield #3.  The airfield was constructed with two asphalt 5'000 foot runways, each with a parallel taxiway.   

The airfield was apparently unmanned, had no buildings nor any permanent units assigned.  It was used for emergency  and for touch-and-go landings as part of the pilot training school.   With the end of World War II and the closure of Mariana AAF, the airfield was closed and abandoned.

With the reopening of Mariana AAF as Grahm Air Base in 1950 as a contract pilot training school,  Bascom was rehabilitated as an auxiliary airfield for Grahm (Grahm #1) and was used for emergency landings.   It was closed again in 1961 with the final closure of Grahm AB and again abandoned.

Today, only a section of the north/south runway of the former airfield's runway is in use, the asphalt surface being in marginal condition.  The remainder of the airfield has had either the asphalt and concrete removed with the east/west runway lying derelict.  It is not open to any general aviation.

See also

 Florida World War II Army Airfields

References 

 Abandoned Airports: Bascom Auxiliary Army Airfield
 World War II airfields database: Florida

External links 
 
 

Airports in Florida
Airfields of the United States Army Air Forces in Florida
Transportation buildings and structures in Jackson County, Florida